Shahabad-e Sadat (also Romanized as Shāhābād-e Sādāt; also known as Shāhābād) is a village in Sadat Rural District, in the Central District of Lali County, Khuzestan Province, Iran. At the 2006 census, its population was 685, in 102 families.

References 

Populated places in Lali County